Scott Alan Scurfield (born 29 March 1963, in Somerset County, Pennsylvania)  is a former Somerset County public defender.   Scurfield is notable for acting in the defense of West Pharmaceutical Services in litigation following the explosion and fire at the company's Kinston, North Carolina facility in January 2003. 

Scurfield has been licensed to practice law in both Pennsylvania and North Carolina, and is a member of the North Carolina State Bar.  He currently practices with the law firm of Riddle & Brantley LLP.

Background
Scurfield earned a Bachelor of Arts degree in Business/Economics from the Johnstown campus of the University of Pittsburgh (magna cum laude) in 1985, and earned a Juris Doctor from the University of Pittsburgh School of Law in 1988.

Scurfield maintained a general law practice in Pennsylvania for twelve years, representing his family's coal mining business and also focusing on litigation, bankruptcy, and criminal defense.  During this period Scurfield took on the responsibility of being a Somerset County public defender. It was in this role that he represented the Pennsylvania State Correctional Institution inmate, Ernest C. Evens, who was accused of beating his cell mate to death in 1995.

References

Living people
1963 births
Pennsylvania lawyers
University of Pittsburgh at Johnstown alumni
University of Pittsburgh School of Law alumni
North Carolina lawyers
Public defenders